Garff is one of the six sheadings of the Isle of Man.

It is located on the east of the island (part of the traditional South Side division) and consists of the two historic parishes of Lonan and Maughold. Before 1796 it also included the parish of Onchan.

Administratively, since May 2016 the sheading of Garff has been covered by a single Garff local authority, a parish district, formed by merging the former village district of Laxey with the parish districts of Lonan and Maughold.

The town of Ramsey, which is administered separately, covers areas of two historic parishes (Maughold, and Lezayre in the sheading of Ayre). It is treated as part of Garff for some purposes, e.g. the coroner.

Other settlements in the sheading include Baldrine and Ballabeg (both in the parish of Lonan), and Ballure in the parish of Maughold.

Etymology

The origin of the name is uncertain. Kneen (1925) suggests that it derives from the Norse gröf (N.B. not grðf, which is a typo there), meaning a pit or ravine (cognate with "grave").

MHKs and elections
Garff is also a House of Keys constituency (excluding (most of) Onchan). It was originally a three-seat constituency, but this was reduced to two seats in 1893 and one seat in 1986. Until 2016 it was heavily under-represented by having only a single MHK. However in the 2016 general election it elected 2 MHKs (the new constituency also includes the (sparsely populated) parish of Onchan, i.e. excluding the village of Onchan).

See also
Local government in the Isle of Man
Laxey Bay
Ramsey Bay

References

External links
Constituency maps and general election results

Sheadings of the Isle of Man
Constituencies of the Isle of Man